is a Japanese singer and actor. He debuted as a singer in 1971 and earned a spot on the Kohaku Utagassen in 1972 with his second single, Aoi ringo. He got his first number one hit with Amai seikatsu in 1974, and his second one with his next single, Shitetsu ensen in 1975.

References

Japanese male singers
1956 births
Living people
Musicians from Gifu Prefecture
Japanese male actors